Craig Ratterree (born November 27, 1986) is an American figure skater. He is the 2005 US Junior national silver medalist. He won the bronze medal at the 2005 Junior Grand Prix event in Canada. He will compete at the 2006 United States Figure Skating Championships as a senior.

Competitive highlights

J = Junior level

External links
  

American male single skaters
1986 births
Living people